Lithium lactate is a chemical compound, a salt of lithium and lactic acid with the formula CH3CH(OH)COOLi, an amorphous solid, very soluble in water.

Synthesis
Synthesis is by neutralization of lactic acid with lithium hydroxide:
 LiOH + CH3CH(OH)COOH → CH3CH(OH)COOLi + H2O

Physical properties
Lithium lactate forms an amorphous solid.

It dissolves very well in water and organic solvents.

The compound demonstrates optical isomerism.

It emits acrid smoke when heated to decomposition.

Chemical properties
It reacts with triphosgene to obtain lactic acid-O-internal anhydride. It can be used as a precursor to prepare Li4SiO4, Li4Ti5O12/C and other materials.

Use
It is part of drugs that promote the excretion of uric acid from the body.

It is also used as an Antipsychotic.

References

Lactates
Lithium compounds